Notogynaphallia nawei is a species of land planarian from Argentina.

Description 
The color of the dorsum is black and the dorsal eyes are perceived as a group of very small whitish dots on about the second fourth of the body. The ventral side is dark gray with a thin whitish median longitudinal line along the body

Etymology 
The specific epithet nawei comes from the Toba word naweĨ, which means "black", and refers to the dorsal color of the species.

Distribution 
Notogynaphallia nawei is found in native forests of the Formosa Province, Argentina, part of the Gran Chaco region.

References 

Geoplanidae
Invertebrates of Argentina